Waterford Works is an unincorporated community located within Waterford Township in Camden County, New Jersey, United States. Waterford Works has a post office with ZIP code 08089, which opened on February 13, 1838.

References

Winslow Township, New Jersey
Unincorporated communities in Camden County, New Jersey
Unincorporated communities in New Jersey